At the end of each FIFA Women's World Cup final tournament, several awards are presented to the players and teams which have distinguished themselves in various aspects of the game.

Awards
There are currently five post-tournament awards from the FIFA Technical Study Group:
the Golden Ball  (currently commercially termed "adidas Golden Ball") for the best overall player of the tournament (first awarded in 1991);
the Golden Boot ((currently commercially termed "adidas Golden Boot", formerly known as the Golden Shoe) for the top goalscorer of the tournament (first awarded in 1991);
the Golden Glove (currently commercially termed "adidas Golden Glove", formerly known as the Best Goalkeeper) for the best goalkeeper of the tournament (first awarded in 2003);
the FIFA Young Player Award for the best player of the tournament under 21 years of age at the start of the calendar year (first awarded in 2011);
the FIFA Fair Play Trophy for the team with the best record of fair play during the tournament (first awarded in 1991).

There is currently one award voted on by fans during the tournament:
the Player of the Match (currently commercially termed "VISA Player of the Match") for outstanding performance by a player during each match of the tournament (first awarded in 2003).

There is currently one award voted on by fans after the conclusion of the tournament:
the Goal of the Tournament (currently commercially termed "Hyundai Goal of the Tournament") for the fans' best goal scored during the tournament (first awarded in 2007).

The following five awards are no longer given:
the All-Star Squad for the best squad of players of the tournament (chosen by the technical study group, awarded from 1999 to 2015);
the Most Entertaining Team for the team that entertained the fans the most during the tournament (voted on by fans after the conclusion of the tournament, awarded in 2003 and 2007);
the FANtasy All-Star Team for the fans' best eleven-player line-up of the tournament (voted on by fans after the conclusion of the tournament, awarded in 2003);
the Dream Team for the fans' best manager and eleven-player line-up of the tournament (voted on by fans after the conclusion of the tournament, awarded in 2015);
the Players Who Dared to Shine for ten key players of the tournament who "dared to shine" (chosen by the technical study group, awarded in 2019).

Golden Ball 
The Golden Ball award is presented to the best player at each FIFA World Cup final, with a shortlist drawn up by the FIFA technical committee and the winner voted for by representatives of the media. Those who finish as runners-up in the vote receive the Silver Ball and Bronze Ball awards as the second and third most outstanding players in the tournament respectively.

Golden Boot 
The Golden Boot award goes to the top goalscorer of the FIFA World Cup. It was introduced as the Golden Shoe at the 1991 FIFA Women's World Cup and renamed to Golden Boot in 2011.

If more than one player finishes the tournament with the same number of goals, the tie goes to the player who has contributed the most assists (with the FIFA Technical Study Group deciding whether an assist is to be counted as such). If there is still a tie, the award goes to the player who has played the least amount of time (most goals per minute).

Silver and Bronze Boots are awarded to the second- and third-placed players.

Golden Glove 
The Golden Glove award recognizes the best goalkeeper of the tournament since 2011. In 2003 and 2007, a Best Goalkeeper award was given, and in 1999 two goalkeepers were named to an All-Star Team. The FIFA Technical Study Group recognises the top goalkeeper of the tournament based on the player's performance throughout the final competition. Although goalkeepers have this specific award for their position, they are eligible for the Golden Ball as well.

FIFA Young Player Award 
The FIFA Young Player Award is given to the best player in the tournament who is at most 21 years old. For the 2019 FIFA Women's World Cup this meant that the player had to have been born on or after 1 January 1998. The FIFA Technical Study Group recognises the Best Young Player of the tournament based on the player's performances throughout the final competition.

FIFA Fair Play Trophy 
The FIFA Fair Play Trophy is given to the team with the best record of fair play during the World Cup final tournament. Only teams that qualified for the second round are considered. The winners of this award earn the FIFA Fair Play Trophy, a diploma, a fair play medal for each player and official, and $50,000 worth of football equipment to be used for youth development.

Player of the Match
The Player of the Match (POTM) award picks the outstanding player in every match of the tournament since 2003. 

While the awards from 2003 to 2015 were chosen by the technical study group, from 2019 the winner has been chosen through an online poll on FIFA's website.

All-Star Squad

Other all-star selections

FANtasy All-Star Team
The "FANtasy All-Star Team", which was sponsored by MasterCard, featured eleven players decided by a poll on FIFA.com.

Dream Team

Players Who Dared to Shine
The FIFA Technical Study Group announced a list of ten key players of the tournament who "dared to shine".

Goal of the Tournament
The Goal of the Tournament award was awarded for the first time at the 2007 FIFA Women's World Cup.
 Scores and results list the goal tally of the players' team first.

Winners

Nominees

All-time best goal
In 2003, FIFA.com held a poll for the greatest goal in Women's World Cup history (from 1991 to 1999). 

The 1991 goal from Michelle Akers-Stahl won the poll.

The similar "15 for 2015" poll was held from 11 May to 5 June 2015, encompassing the best goals from 1991 to 2011. 

Abby Wambach, who won the Goal of the Tournament in 2011, was chosen.

Most Entertaining Team

See also

 FIFA World Cup awards
 UEFA European Championship awards
 Copa América awards
 Africa Cup of Nations awards
 AFC Asian Cup awards
 CONCACAF Gold Cup awards
 OFC Nations Cup awards
 FIFA Women's World Cup
 FIFA U-20 Women's World Cup
 FIFA U-17 Women's World Cup
 List of sports awards honoring women

References

External links
 FIFA Women's World Cup Awards

Women's World Cup
Women's association football trophies and awards
FIFA Women's World Cup-related lists